The Nepal Mountaineering Association (NMA) is the national mountaineering association of Nepal. The NMA was founded in 1973 with the goals of promoting mountaineering activities in the Himalaya, providing safety awareness and mountaineering skills to Nepalese mountaineers and creating awareness of the beauty of the Himalayas both nationally and in international communities. The NMA is an active member of the UIAA.

The NMA was also responsible for administering climbing permits for 27 mountains with altitudes between 5,800 metres and 6,600 metres categorised as trekking peaks, while permits for all other mountains open for climbing in Nepal (approximately 300 peaks) are issued by the Ministry of Culture, Tourism and Civil Aviation (MoTCA). In October 2015 the Government of Nepal announced that responsibility for the trekking peaks would be transferred from NMA to MoTCA.

See also
List of Mount Everest guides
Nepal Mountain Academy

References

External links 
 
Nepal Mountaineering Association archive at m.economictimes.com

Clubs and societies in Nepal
Alpine clubs
Mountaineering in Nepal
1973 establishments in Nepal